Reda Ribinskaitė (born 8 June 1966) is a Lithuanian rower. She competed in the women's coxed four event at the 1988 Summer Olympics.

References

1966 births
Living people
Lithuanian female rowers
Olympic rowers of the Soviet Union
Rowers at the 1988 Summer Olympics
Sportspeople from Marijampolė